Avalanch is a Spanish heavy metal band formed in Asturias in 1993.

Led by composer, producer and guitar player Alberto Rionda, the band has released nine studio albums, plus a handful of compilations, DVDs and English versions of their works.

Biography
Spanish band Avalanch combines power metal and progressive metal with elements of hard rock, pop and folk. Their albums are published in several European and American countries, and they mostly tour in Latin America. They have been described as one of the "leading" Spanish-language heavy metal bands.

Discography

Studio albums
La Llama Eterna (1997)
Llanto De Un Héroe (1999)
El Ángel Caído (2001)
Los Poetas Han Muerto (2003)
El Hijo Pródigo (2005)
Muerte Y Vida (2007)
El Ladrón De Sueños (2010)
Malefic Time: Apocalypse (2011)
El Secreto (Castilian version) / The Secret (English version) (2019)

DVD
Cien Veces (2005)
Lágrimas Negras (2006)
Caminar sobre el agua (2008)

Compilations and re-recorded albums
Eternal Flame (1998) (English version of La Llama Eterna)
Mother Earth (2004) (English version of Los Poetas Han Muerto)
Las Ruinas del Edén (2004) – Re-recorded songs.
Un Paso Más (2005) – Greatest hits.
Del Cielo a la Tierra (2012) - Greatest hits.
El ángel caido (2017) - Re-recorded songs.

Live albums
Días De Gloria (2000)
Caminar sobre el agua (2008)
 Hacia La Luz - Directo desde Madrid (2018)

Demos
Ready To The Glory

See also
WarCry
List of bands from Spain

References

External links
Official website

Asturian music
Progressive metal musical groups
Spanish alternative metal musical groups
Spanish power metal musical groups
Spanish heavy metal musical groups
Musical groups established in 1993
Musical groups disestablished in 2012
1993 establishments in Spain
Rock en Español music groups